Matthias Krieger (born 1 August 1984) is a German Paralympic judoka. He represented Germany at the 2004 Summer Paralympics, at the 2008 Summer Paralympics and at the 2012 Summer Paralympics. He won a bronze medal in the men's 81 kg event in 2012. In the semi-finals, he lost against Olexandr Kosinov of Ukraine and Kosinov went on to win the gold medal in this event.

References

External links 
 
 

1984 births
Living people
German male judoka
Paralympic judoka of Germany
Paralympic bronze medalists for Germany
Paralympic medalists in judo
Judoka at the 2004 Summer Paralympics
Judoka at the 2008 Summer Paralympics
Judoka at the 2012 Summer Paralympics
Medalists at the 2012 Summer Paralympics
People from Sinsheim
Sportspeople from Karlsruhe (region)
21st-century German people